Bel-Air Heights (also spelled Bel Air Heights; French: Hauteurs Bel Air) is a neighbourhood in College Ward in the west end of Ottawa, Ontario, Canada. It is bounded on the east by Agincourt Road, on the south by Baseline Road, on the west by Navaho Drive and on the north by the Central Experimental Farm Pathway. The neighbourhood is mostly a middle class housing neighbourhood.

Most of the homes were built in 1959 and 1960. Construction began by the Campeau Corporation in June 1958. There are a few apartments on Baseline and Navaho that were built later on. The neighbourhood has three parks; Agincourt Park, Ainsley Park and Navaho Park. For schools there is Agincourt Public School, J. H. Putman Public School, Charlotte Lemieux French School and Woodroffe High School.

The population of the area is roughly 2500.

Along with Bel-Air Park and Braemar Park, the area is part of the Bel-Air Community Association.

References 

Neighbourhoods in Ottawa